Henry Samson (26 November 1927 – 2011) was a Brazilian water polo player. He competed in the men's tournament at the 1960 Summer Olympics.

References

External links
 

1927 births
2011 deaths
Brazilian male water polo players
Olympic water polo players of Brazil
Water polo players at the 1960 Summer Olympics
Water polo players from Rio de Janeiro (city)